Dallas Davidson is an American country music singer and songwriter from Albany, Georgia, who has written for artists such as Blake Shelton, Jason Aldean, Cole Swindell, Jake Owen, Luke Bryan, Randy Houser, Lady Antebellum, and Billy Currington. He generally writes with others, notably as a member of The Peach Pickers.

Career
Davidson moved to Nashville, Tennessee in 2004 and joined Broadcast Music Incorporated (BMI) for performing rights representation and signed a publishing deal with Big Borassa Music, which lasted until 2008. Davidson signed with EMI Music Publishing Nashville in 2008 and extended his contract with them in 2012.

Trace Adkins recorded Davidson's "Honky Tonk Badonkadonk" shortly after Davidson arrived in Nashville, taking the song to number 2 on the country charts in early 2006. Davidson co-wrote the Brad Paisley-Keith Urban duet "Start a Band", which reached number 1 in January 2009. This song was nominated for a Grammy in the category Best Country Collaboration with vocals. He also co-wrote Billy Currington's "That's How Country Boys Roll", which went to number 1 in 2010.

Other singles that Davidson co-wrote in the late 2000s included "Put a Girl in It" by Brooks & Dunn, "Barefoot and Crazy" by Jack Ingram and "Gimmie That Girl" by Joe Nichols, all collaborations with Rhett Akins and Ben Hayslip, also known as The Peach Pickers. "Gimmie That Girl" made it to number 1 on the charts in April 2010.

In 2010, Davidson also co-wrote "All About Tonight" by Blake Shelton, "All Over Me" by Josh Turner and "Rain Is a Good Thing" by Luke Bryan. These songs earned Davidson the award for Billboard's Hot Country Music Songwriter of 2010.

Other songs that Davidson co-wrote and featured in the Billboard Hot 100 include Justin Moore's "If Heaven Wasn't So Far Away", Lady Antebellum's "Just a Kiss" and "We Owned the Night". Luke Bryan also recorded Davidson's "Country Girl (Shake It for Me)", "I Don't Want This Night to End" and "That's My Kind of Night". In 2013, he co-wrote "Runnin' Outta Moonlight" by Randy Houser, "Granddaddy's Gun" by Aaron Lewis and "Keep Them Kisses Comin'" by Craig Campbell.

Davidson received the 2012 ACM Songwriter of the Year; a 2012 ACM nominee for Song of the Year (for "Just a Kiss"); the 2011 BMI Country Awards’ Songwriter of the Year together with Rhett Akins. He is also a recipient of three CMA Triple Play Awards, one in 2010 and two in 2011; this award is given to songwriters who write three number-one singles in a one-year span. Davidson is the Chairman of the Georgia Music Foundation. In 2015 he launched his own publishing company, Play It Again.

Personal life 
Davidson is married with two sons.

Discography

Studio albums

Collaboration albums

Music videos

Songs written

References

American country singer-songwriters
Living people
Musicians from Albany, Georgia
Country musicians from Georgia (U.S. state)
Year of birth missing (living people)
American male singer-songwriters
Singer-songwriters from Georgia (U.S. state)